Tomás Alberto Peribonio Ávila (born 16 January 1996) is an Ecuadorian swimmer. He made his international debut at the 2015 Pan American Games, where he was a finalist.  He has competed at the 2015 World Aquatics Championships (Kazan, Russia), the 2016 FINA World Swimming Championships (Windsor, Ontario, Canada) the 2017 World Aquatics Championships (Budapest, Hungary), the 2018 FINA World Swimming Championships (Hangzhou, China) and the 2019 World Aquatics Championships (Gwangju, South Korea).  He currently holds 9 national records in Olympic events, including the 200 Meters Individual Medley and 400 Meters Individual Medley.

He competed at the 2020 Summer Olympics.

References

1996 births
Living people
Ecuadorian male swimmers
Swimmers at the 2015 Pan American Games
South Carolina Gamecocks men's swimmers
Male medley swimmers
Swimmers at the 2019 Pan American Games
Pan American Games competitors for Ecuador
Swimmers at the 2020 Summer Olympics
Olympic swimmers of Ecuador
Swimmers from Florida
21st-century Ecuadorian people
Sportspeople from Miami